See also "Anna (daughter of Boris I)".

Anna (in Bulgarian: Анна) was a Bulgarian noble lady and the daughter of the Khan of Bulgaria. She lived in the 9th century.

Life 
Anna was a daughter of the Khan Presian I of Bulgaria (Персиян), who was a pagan. Her mother’s name is unknown, whilst her grandfather was called Zvinitsa. The original name of Anna is also unknown – she was a pagan, but she later converted to Christianity. According to the chronicle, she was captured by the Byzantines, and whilst she was living at the court of the Emperor, she was converted to Christianity, but was exchanged for the monk Theodoros Koupharas.

The (half-)brother of Anna was Boris I of Bulgaria, who became a Christian – like Anna – and is celebrated as a saint in Bulgaria. He named his daughter after Anna.

It is unknown when Anna died. She was buried in Bulgaria.

Footnotes 

Bulgarian princesses
Converts to Christianity from pagan religions
Krum's dynasty
Daughters of emperors